Ansonia is an unincorporated community in Shippen Township, Tioga County, in the U.S. state of Pennsylvania. It lies along U.S. Route 6, near its junction with Pennsylvania Route 362, between Galeton and Wellsboro.

Ansonia is at the confluence of Marsh Creek and Pine Creek.  The Pine Creek Rail Trail passes through Ansonia, where there is an access area.

References

Unincorporated communities in Tioga County, Pennsylvania
Unincorporated communities in Pennsylvania